Three ships of the United States Navy have been named USS Gettysburg for the Battle of Gettysburg.

 was built in 1858, captured in 1863, commissioned in 1864 and decommissioned in 1879
 was commissioned in 1945, named Gettysburg in 1956 and sold for scrap in 1960
 was commissioned in 1991 and is currently in active service

United States Navy ship names